Kalleh Sar-e Olya (also Romanized as Kalleh Sar-e ‘Olyā; also known as Kalleh Sar-e Bālā) is a village in Ojarud-e Shomali Rural District, in the Central District of Germi County, Ardabil Province, Iran. At the 2006 census, its population was 45, in 8 families.

References 

Towns and villages in Germi County